The 2016–17 Saint Joseph's Hawks women's basketball team will represent the Saint Joseph's University during the 2016–17 NCAA Division I women's basketball season. The Hawks, led by sixteenth year head coach Cindy Griffin, played their home games at Hagan Arena and were members of the Atlantic 10 Conference. They finished the season 17–15, 12–4 in A-10 play to finish in a tie for fourth place. They advanced to the semifinals of the A-10 women's tournament where they lost to Duquesne. They were invited to the Women's National Invitation Tournament where lost to Virginia in the first round.

2016–17 media
All non-televised Hawks home games will air on the A-10 Digital Network. All Hawks games will be streamed via the Saint Joseph's Sports Network on sjuhawks.com.

Roster

Schedule

|-
!colspan=9 style=| Non-conference regular season

|-
!colspan=9 style=| Atlantic 10 regular season

|-
!colspan=9 style="background:#990000; color:#FFFFFF;"| Atlantic 10 Women's Tournament

|-
!colspan=9 style="background:#990000; color:#FFFFFF;"| WNIT

Rankings
2016–17 NCAA Division I women's basketball rankings

See also
 2016–17 Saint Joseph's Hawks men's basketball team

References

Saint Joseph's Hawks women's basketball seasons
Saint Josephs
Saint Joseph's
Saint Joseph's
2017 Women's National Invitation Tournament participants